Samsonia is a genus of Gram-negative bacteria in the family Yersiniaceae. Species within this genus were originally found in the bark of diseased Erythrina trees. Among bacterial plant pathogens within the Enterobacterales, Samsonia species may be most closely related to Pectobacterium species. Until now, only one species of this genus has been described (S. erythrinae).

References

Gram-negative bacteria
Monotypic bacteria genera
Bacteria genera